Washingborough railway station was a railway station serving the village of Washingborough, Lincolnshire.

History

The station was opened by the Great Northern Railway (GNR) on 17 October 1848.

The GNR was a constituent of the London and North Eastern Railway (LNER) which was formed on 1 January 1923; and it was the LNER which closed the station on 29 July 1940.

References

External links
 Washingborough station on navigable 1947 O. S. map

Disused railway stations in Lincolnshire
Former Great Northern Railway stations
Railway stations in Great Britain opened in 1848
Railway stations in Great Britain closed in 1940